Watertown Municipal Airport may refer to:

 Watertown Municipal Airport (Wisconsin) in Watertown, Wisconsin, United States (FAA: RYV)
 Watertown Regional Airport (formerly Watertown Municipal) in Watertown, South Dakota, United States (FAA: ATY)

See also
 Watertown Airport (disambiguation)